Dzhulunitsa is a village in Northern Bulgaria. The village is located in Lyaskovets Municipality, Veliko Tarnovo Province. Аccording to the numbers provided by the 2020 Bulgarian census, Dzhulunitsa currently has a population of 1673 people with a permanent address registration in the settlement.

Geography and Culture 
Dzhulunitsa village is located in Northern Bulgaria. The elevation in the village varies between 63 and 385 meters with an average of 106 meters. The climate of the village is continental. It lies on the borders of the Balkan Mountains and the Danubian Plain (Bulgaria). The highest geographical point of the area is 385 m with the peak “The Pyramid” in the area “Romana”. There is a very well developed vegetable production, viticulture, fruit growing, animal husbandry and grain production in the village. A river with the same name as the village passes through it.

History 
The name of the village comes from the word Dzhulun, which means a water caltrop. In the area around the village, a lot of natural growing water caltrops could be found. The first mentions of the village date back to the 13th century. The oldest ever found burial on the Balkan peninsula is near the village. (A mound from the  Neolithic period, which is located near the highway and was covered by national television.)

The village's festival is held yearly on the date of 15 August. It is also called the potato festival and is organized by the local pension club. During the Balkan wars, one person has volunteered from the village to join the war.

Buildings 

 Elementary school (Was built in 1834)
 Kindergarten (Established in 1966)
 Pharmacy
 Orthodox Church
 Hospital

Notable people 
Most notable person from the village is Kotoōshū Katsunori, a rikishi japanese sumo fighter.

Ethnicity 
According to the Bulgarian population census in 2011.

References 

Villages in Veliko Tarnovo Province